Late Love (German: Späte Liebe) is a 1943 German historical drama film directed by Gustav Ucicky and starring Paula Wessely, Attila Hörbiger and Inge List.

The film's sets were designed by the art director Werner Schlichting. It was shot at the Rosenhügel Studios in Vienna.

Plot
The impoverished noblewoman Sophie von Angerspang has a big problem. Her younger sister Steffi is seriously ill with respiratory disease and therefore absolutely in need of a spa. Only the good mountain air in Davos, Switzerland could help, but unfortunately Sophie cannot afford such a stay because her job as a China painter pays too little. Therefore, she decides to marry the manufacturer August Polzer, who has been courting her for a long time. Sophie also doesn't hide the deeper reason why she accepts his proposal after all. Even under these circumstances, August is willing to marry Sophie because secretly he fervently hopes that a marriage of purpose and reason will eventually grow into a marriage of love.

The younger sister eventually marries a French man but gets seriously sick. Only after Sophie recognizes her husband's good heart, who travels to France and personally helps to care for Steffi do Sophie and August find together.

Cast
Paula Wessely as Sophie von Angerspang 
Attila Hörbiger as August Polzer 
Inge List as Steffi von Angerspang 
Fred Liewehr as von Pioletti 
Erik Frey as von Lammersbach 
Ferdinand Mayerhofer as Mr. Steininger 
Auguste Pünkösdy as Mrs. Steininger 
Klaramaria Skala as Betti Steininger 
Monique Joyce as Suzanne 
Eddy Ghilain as Maurice 
Gustav Waldau as Toni 
Karl Ehmann as accountant
Rosl Dorena as cook 
Gertrude Prapscha as Monika
Georges Chamarat as Arzt 
Franz Böheim
Willy Rösner
Paula Conrad
Hertha Kraus
Lola Hübner
Fritz Puchstein
Oskar Wegrostek
Roger Dann

References

External links

1940s historical drama films
German historical drama films
Films of Nazi Germany
Films directed by Gustav Ucicky
German black-and-white films
Films set in the 1880s
1943 drama films
Films shot at Rosenhügel Studios
1940s German-language films
1940s German films